Table tennis is a popular indoor recreation sport in India, which has caught on in states like West Bengal, Tamil Nadu, Maharashtra, and Gujarat. The Table Tennis Federation of India is the official sports body. As of February 2019, India's Men's Team ranked 10th and Women's team ranked 22nd in the World. India has produced singles player ranked in the top 50 both in Men's and Women's category,

Total medals won by Indian Paddlers in Major tournaments

References

External links 
 Web site of the Table Tennis Federation of India